Chlorpromazine includes the following list of adverse effects (serious adverse effects appear in bold):

Very common

 Sedation (cf. "Thorazine shuffle" – a shuffling gait due to sedation)
 Somnolence
 Extrapyramidal symptoms
 Weight gain
 Orthostatic hypotension
 Dry mouth
 Constipation

Common

 ECG changes
 Contact dermatitis
 Sensitivity to light
 Urticaria (hives)
 Maculopapular rash
 Petechia or edema
 Hyperprolactinaemia
 Impaired thermoregulation
 Hyperglycaemia
 Other hypothalamic abnormalities
 Blurred vision
 Confusion
 Raised ANA titre
 Positive SLE cells
 Mydriasis
 Atonic colon
 Seizure
 Psychomotor agitation|Agitation (restlessness)
 Pain at the injection site
 Injection site abscess

Uncommon

 Miosis
 Urinary retention
 Nasal congestion
 Nausea
 Obstipation
 Arrhythmias
 Skin pigmentation
 Glycosuria
 Hypoglycaemia
 Paralytic ileus

Rare

 Agranulocytosis
 Haemolytic anaemia
 Aplastic anaemia
 A-V block
 Hypertensive crises
 Thrombocytopenic purpura
 Exfoliative dermatitis
 Toxic epidermal necrolysis
 Systemic lupus erythematosus
 Syndrome of inappropriate secretion of antidiuretic hormone (SIADH)
 Water retention
 Cholestatic jaundice
 Liver injury
 Neuroleptic malignant syndrome
 Myasthenia gravis

Unknown frequency

 Leucopaenia
 Eosinophilia
 Pancytopaenia
 Priapism
 Photophobia
 Corneal deposits
 Respiratory depression
 Ventricular tachycardia
 QT interval prolongation
 Atrial fibrilation
 Hyperthermia
 Hypothermia
 Galactorrhoea
 Breast enlargement in either sex
 False-positive pregnancy tests
 Allergic reaction
 Fits
 Cerebral oedema
 Urinary incontinence
 Coagulation defects
 Nightmares
 Abnormality of cerebrospinal fluid proteins
 Dysphoria
 Catatonic excitement
 Narrow angle glaucoma
 Optic atrophy
 Pigmentary retinopathy
 Amenorrhoea
 Infertility
 Tardive dyskinesia

Notes

References

Chlorpromazine